The Minglanilla Science High School (Mataas na Paaralang Pang-Agham ng Minglanilla) is a public science high school in Poblacion Ward 1, Minglanilla, Cebu, Philippines. It is a DepEd-recognized science high school.

History
The school was founded in 1996, with Carmencita Dinampo as supervisor for the high school and elementary department, and was named the Minglanilla Science and Technology School, which is shortened to SciTech. People still use this moniker in reference to the school. Under Dinampo's reign, it was renamed Minglanilla School of the Future.

In 1998, when Dinampo was promoted, Rosita Sanico took over. In her time the high school and elementary department were separated. It was renamed Minglanilla National Science High School.

From an enrollment of 31 high school students in 1996, Minglanilla has a student population of 413 (as of school year 2014-15); from a one-section school, it now has a minimum of two for each year level; from a beginning of one-classroom setting on the premises of the Minglanilla Central School, it now has 13 classrooms, one computer laboratory, and a campus.

Admissions
The entrance screening consists of tests in verbal, abstract reasoning, science and mathematics. To be eligible for admission, applicants must be Filipino students who belong to the top 10% of their graduating class or must have special aptitude in science and math.

Admission tests are administered by the Division Science/Mathematics Supervisor in coordination with the Secondary Education Division Chief. The examinees with the best scores in the entrance examination in mathematics, english and science (written and practical) will be selected until the enrollment limit has been reached. Selected applicants then undergo an interview to be administered by the school's guidance counselor.

External links
 

Science high schools in the Philippines
Schools in Metro Cebu
High schools in Cebu